The Pennsylvania Railroad's class Q2 comprised one prototype and twenty-five production duplex steam locomotives of 4-4-6-4 wheel arrangement.

They were the largest non-articulated locomotives ever built and the most powerful locomotives ever static tested, producing 7,987 cylinder horsepower (5,956 kW) on the PRR's static test plant.  They were by far the most successful duplex type. The duplex propensity to slip was combated by an automatic slip control mechanism that reduced power to the slipping unit.

These were an improved version of the previous Q1 class, which was a 4-6-4-4 dual-purpose engine instead of a 4-4-6-4 freight engine.

Despite the overall success, the Q2s were all out of service by 1951.  With dieselization, they were the obvious first targets to be withdrawn since they were only a little more capable than the conventional J1 class 2-10-4s, but with far-higher operating and maintenance costs. The final Q2, 6199's power output is 7,987 hp. All have been scrapped and none were preserved.

References 

4-4-6-4 locomotives
Duplex locomotives
Experimental locomotives
Q2
Steam locomotives of the United States
Scrapped locomotives
Freight locomotives
Standard gauge locomotives of the United States